District 8 can refer to:

District 8 Jakarta, in Indonesia
District 8 (Ho Chi Minh City), in Vietnam
VIII District, Turku, in Finland
VIII District, Budapest, in Hungary
Riesbach, also known as District 8, in Zürich, Switzerland
 District 8, an electoral district of Malta
 District 8, a police district of Malta
 District 8 Athletic Association a secondary school sports association in Kitchener, Ontario Canada also known as District 8 or D8
District 8 (Hunger Games), fictional district in the Hunger Games books and films
Williams County School District 8

See also
8th arrondissement (disambiguation)
District 7 (disambiguation)
District 9 (disambiguation)